The Fire Free Alliance (FFA) is a multi-stakeholder group initiated for the management of recurrent haze and fire problems occurring in Indonesia. The group was founded in 2016 by APRIL and Asian Agri, Musim Mas, Wilmar, and NGOs including PM.Haze, Rumah Pohon, and IDH. The FFA seeks to achieve fire prevention mainly via community engagement.

Members 
Founding members of the FFA include:
 Asia Pacific Resources International Holdings Ltd. (APRIL)
 Asian Agri Group
 Musim Mas Holdings
 Wilmar International Limited
 PM.Haze [NGO]
 Rumah Pohon [NGO]
 IDH (The Sustainable Trade Initiative)[NGO]

In 2017 two more organisations joined the FFA, including:
 Sime Darby Berhad
 IOI Corporation Berhad

History of FFA 
The FFA was launched on 29 February 2016 in Jakarta. Based on the successful implementation of the Fire-Free Village Program (FFVP), a smaller-scaled fire management pilot program initiated and led by APRIL, the FFA currently seeks to implement the FFVP across a broader landscape. The FFVP, launched a year earlier in July 2015, was first implemented in nine villages in Riau, Indonesia. The FFVP focused on fire prevention and suppression, and encompassed a five-pronged approach including no-burning incentives for villagers, community fire crew leaders, sustainable agricultural alternatives, air quality monitoring, and a community awareness program. After encouraging results were seen, with fire incidence decreasing by up to 90 per cent, the programme was subsequently expanded to 20 villages. The successful implementation of the FFVP provided the impetus for the development of the FFA, which seeks to implement and scale the FFVP across to other communities and landscapes.

Implementation 
According to the group's 2016 Member Review, companies in the FFA currently engage with more than 200 villages with some or all of the following key projects:

Impact of FFA's Initiatives 
The debilitating effects of the 2015 fire season in Indonesia resulted in an international diplomatic situation, as neighbouring countries in the South-East Asia region including Malaysia and Singapore suffered from serious haze conditions. Since then, while the FFVP and FFA have been acknowledged for their positive influence, non-governmental organisations (NGOs) such as Greenpeace and Scale Up have critiqued the program for not doing enough.

According to the FFA's 2016 Members Review, members of the FFA achieved the following in 2016:

References

2016 establishments in Indonesia
Environmental organizations based in Indonesia
Organizations based in Jakarta